The Univac Series 90 is an obsolete family of mainframe class computer systems from UNIVAC first introduced in 1973. The low end family members included the 90/25, 90/30 and 90/40 that ran the OS/3 operating system.  The intermediate members of the family were the 90/60 and 90/70, while the 90/80, announced in 1976, was the high end system. The 90/60 through 90/80 systems all ran the Univac’s virtual memory operating system, VS/9.
  
The Series 90 systems were the replacement for the UNIVAC 9000 series of low end, mainframe systems marketed by Sperry Univac during the 1960s.  The 9000 series systems were byte-addressable machines with an instruction set that was compatible with the IBM System/360.  The family included the 9200, 9300, 9400, and 9480 systems. The 9200 and 9300 ran the Minimum Operating system. This system was loaded from cards, but thereafter also supported magnetic tape or magnetic disk for programs and data. The 9400 and 9480 ran a real memory operating system called OS/4.  As Sperry moved into the 1970s, they expanded the 9000 family with the introduction of the 9700 system in 1971.  They were also developing a new real memory operating system for the 9700 called OS/7.

In January 1972, Sperry officially took over the RCA customer base, offering the Spectra 70 and RCA Series computers as the UNIVAC Series 70. They redesigned the 9700, adding virtual memory, and renamed the processor the 90/70. They cancelled development of OS/7 in favor of VS/9, a renamed RCA VMOS.
A number of the RCA customers continued with Sperry, and the 90/60 and 90/70 would provide an upgrade path for the customers with 70/45, 70/46, RCA 2 and 3 systems. In 1976, Sperry added the 90/80 at the top end of the Series 90 Family, based on an RCA design, providing an upgrade path for the 70/60, 70/61, RCA 6 and 7 systems.

The RCA base was very profitable for Sperry and Sperry was able to put together a string of 40 quarters of profit. Sperry also offered their own 1100 family of systems and the 1100/60 provided an entry level system for converting the Series 90 customer base. Around 1982-83, Sperry announced they would cap the Series 90 Systems and would decommit the VS/9 operating system to concentrate on the 1100 series. After this announcement, Sperry would stumble on the revenue side ending their run of profitable quarters, resulting in some downsizing. The Series 90 Systems suffered from pressure from the IBM 4300 series systems that offered superior price performance and may have induced Sperry to concentrate on the 1100. In a short time Digital Equipment Corporation, with their flagship VAX line of midrange computers would pass Sperry in terms of total revenue to become the number two U.S. computer manufacturer after IBM.

References 

90
Computer-related introductions in 1973